Karnan is a 2021 Indian Tamil-language action drama film directed by Mari Selvaraj, and produced by Kalaipuli S. Thanu. The film stars Dhanush, Rajisha Vijayan (in her Tamil debut), Lal, Yogi Babu and Natarajan Subramaniam The film features music composed by Santhosh Narayanan, cinematography handled by Theni Eswar, and editing done by Selva R. K. Loosely influenced from the 1995 Kodiyankulam caste violence, the film features the titular character Karnan, hailing from a conservative background, fighting for the rights of his people.

After a brief-long pre-production work, the film was launched in January 2020, with the title Karnan was also announced. The film is mostly set in rural Thoothukudi district. Shooting of the film took place, following its launch, and was completed in December 2020; although production was delayed due to the COVID-19 pandemic. It was theatrically released on 9 April 2021 to critical acclaim. It was also one of the highest grossing Tamil films of 2021, although its theatrical run was abruptly ended due to restrictions following the COVID-19 pandemic. Publications like The Indian Express named Karnan as one of the best Tamil films of 2021.

Plot 
In Southern Tamil Nadu, two neighbouring villages Melur and Podiyankulam in Tirunelveli find themselves in constant conflict as the latter is denied a bus stop. Podiyankulam's inhabitants, who belong to the oppressed communities, are forced to use the bus stop of Melur for commuting, which irks the locals who belong to the dominant castes. Despite multiple petitions, Podiyankulam is constantly denied a bus stop thanks to the influence of Melur's local government.  

Sometime in the late 1990s, Karnan, who is from Podiyankulam wins the local deity's sword as part of a competition, which had not been won for years. Weeks later, Karnan participates in an open selection camp for the Central Reserve Police Force (CRPF), where his grandfather Yaema Raja is worried that Karnan would lose the opportunity to join government service, if his hot-headedness would involve him in any legal trouble with the Melur villagers and is constantly looking out for him. 

Within Podiyankulam, Karnan and Yaeman are considered unruly by many except its chieftain Duryodhanan, who befriends them both. This does not sit well with Vadamaalaiyan, one of the village's heads who desires to marry Karnan's sister Padmini, who is far younger than him. Vadamaalaiyan's sister Draupadhi, who is in love with Karnan, misunderstands the situation during the latter's brawl with her brother and breaks up with him.  

Meanwhile, tensions escalate between Melur and Podiyankulam, as Karnan along with his friends and Yaema Raja vandalises a bus for not stopping by to help a pregnant lady. The bus owner files a complaint with the police and the district's Police Superintendent Kannabiran arrives on the scene. Though the bus owner and Podiyankulam's residents settle the issue amicably, the incident bruises Kannabiran's ego who feels that the villagers must always be shown their place. He asks Podiyankulam's village heads to come and sign at the area police station, only to brutally assault them for an hour and lock them up overnight. He insults them verbally and orders local police to file unrelated cases on them.  

Next day early morning, Karnan and others arrive to the station and enquire about the elders. The police feign ignorance and send them out. The helper boy in the tea shop outside tells Karnan about the incidents of previous night, and Karnan storms into the station. The guys fight off the police, find the elders on rooftop under the burning sun and take them home using a confiscated tractor. Podiyankulam barricades itself and prepares for a police attack to face the consequences of Karnan's actions. 

However, the District Collector warns Kannabiran to avoid casualties at all costs. Draupadhi and Vadamaalaiyan settle their issues with Karnan, and Yaema Raja works on providing security to the villagers. However, Karnan receives his appointment letter from the CRPF. He refuses to leave, but is forced to leave by Yaema Raja and the villagers, to have a better future. Minutes after Karnan leaves, the police brutally attack the village. To save his community, Yaema Raja kills himself by self-immolation, and Karnan is forced to return with the local deity's sword in hand. He and Kannabiran face each other, and he traps him using the sword. He takes him hostage inside a hut, ending the clash. Karnan orders the police to bring in the MP, MLA and all important officers within an hour. Inside the hut, Kannabiran and Karnan fight, ending with Karnan overpowering Kannabiran for good. 

Kannabiran again exhalts his caste pride and predicts that Karnan's village will be soon destroyed due to his actions. Enraged, Karnan decapitates Kannabiran, and he is arrested. Karnan is released from prison after ten years. The village Podiyankulam has gotten a bus stop, many of the village youths are now educated, but most of the older village heads succumbed to medical issues caused as aftermath of the police brutality, Padmini is married and the village's community hall has a picture of Yaema Raja painted on a huge wall. The villagers begin to celebrate Karnan's return.

Cast

Production

Development 
In November 2018, Dhanush announced his upcoming project will be directed by Mari Selvaraj, who also appreciated the director's debut film Pariyerum Perumal for its making and content. Selvaraj too confirmed the news in his tweet, and Kalaipuli S. Thanu backed the project under his production house V Creations, his second consecutive film with Dhanush, after Vetrimaaran's Asuran (2019). Despite its announcement, the project's launch was delayed owing to Dhanush's other commitments. In August 2019, reports stated that the film will be tentatively titled as Karnan, although no official confirmation revealed from the producers.

In September 2019, sources claimed that the film may begin production in December 2019, once Dhanush completes shooting for the Karthik Subbaraj-directorial titled Jagame Thandhiram. On 27 September, Dhanush met Mari Selvaraj in London while shooting for D40, in order to finalise the script for the film. After Dhanush was impressed by the narration of the final script, the makers kick-started the pre-production works of the film on 29 September, with Santhosh Narayanan being announced as the composer. On 6 January 2020, the makers officially announced the film's title as Karnan. The film is loosely based on the 1995 Kodiyankulam violence.

Casting 
In September 2019, Malayalam actress Rajisha Vijayan signed the female lead opposite Dhanush, thus making her debut in Tamil. The following month, veteran actor Lal was also brought on board for the project. In December 2019, Natarajan Subramaniam also confirmed his part in the film. Tamil comedian and actor Yogi Babu, who appeared in Selavraj's debut film Pariyerum Perumal was roped in for the film's cast, which marked his maiden collaboration with Dhanush. During the pooja ceremony of the film, Babu and Vijayan were present in the film's cast, which confirmed their inclusion in the project. In January 2020, a still from the sets featuring Dhanush and Lal, was released with Dhanush essaying the titular character Karnan, whereas the latter's character was revealed as Yemen. Lakshmi Priyaa Chandramouli and Gouri G. Kishan were roped in as supporting cast.

Filming 
After wrapping the shoot for Karthik Subbaraj's Jagame Thandhiram, Dhanush joined the film's sets in Tirunelveli on 3 January. A launch ceremony for the film was held in a simple manner on 6 January 2020, and principal photography commenced the same day. Mari Selvaraj and art director T. Ramalingam recreated a replica miniature model of a village in the district.

With the shooting being progressed in a brisk pace, Dhaunsh unveiled a still from the film through social media platforms on 28 January. The picture features a silhouette of Dhanush holding a sword in his hand. The still went viral upon release with unique poster designs, with the still making rounds on the internet. On 24 February 2020, Dhanush posted a picture from the sets during the completion of the film's second schedule. The makers completed 90% of the film's portions, before being halted due to the COVID-19 pandemic induced lockdown in India in March 2020. Nine months later, on 25 November 2020, the team resumed film shooting in order to complete few patchwork scenes and was wrapped up on 9 December 2020.

Themes 
In a 2020 Ananda Vikatan interview, director Mari Selvaraj refused the connections of the Kodiyankulam violence with the script. He further added that "This is a work of fiction. It will have some elements of truth. But there is no need for film directors to portray truth. There are newspapers and magazines to inform the masses about the truth. We are reading and listening to a lot of stories. We take inspiration from those stories to create a film."

Director Mari Selvaraj in an interview with a news portal, stated the reason for the film's title as well as Dhanush's character in the film. He explained that "While the Karnan from Mahabharata was the one who gave away all his worldly belongings, Dhanush's Karnan has nothing to offer in the film as he comes from a conservative background. Karnan will also be seen fighting for his rights in the movie."

Jaya Gomathi Mirra, editor and chief film critic working for Cinema Express, reviewing for Karnan stated about the parallel themes involved with Mahabharata and its similarity with the plot and characters, as also film critic Baradwaj Rangan. Along with this, Mirra also reviewed the similarities and the connections with Selvaraj's previous film Pariyerum Perumal; she also reviewed about the political and artistic resonances in world cinema, quoting the likes of Seven Samurai, Bacurau and Les Misérables which also had similarities with the film.

Music 

The film's soundtrack is composed by Santhosh Narayanan, in his second collaboration with Mari Selvaraj after Pariyerum Perumal, and fourth collaboration with Dhanush after Kodi, Vada Chennai and Jagame Thandhiram. In November 2019, Santhosh started the music production of the film with some folk artists across Tamil Nadu. The music album which was marketed by Think Music, features seven tracks in total, which includes four songs and three instrumentals; while three of the songs: "Kandaa Vara Sollunga", "Manjanathi Puranam" and "Thattaan Thattaan" were released as singles on 17, 25 February and 3 March 2021, the fourth single "Uttradheenga Yeppov" was also released along with the soundtrack album on 7 March 2021, with a promotional event being hosted for the release on the same day.

Release

Theatrical 
The makers clarified the film's theatrical release on 9 April 2021, with its first look poster which unveiled in February 2021. Aashirvad Cinemas acquired the distribution rights of the film in Kerala. The satellite rights were sold to Zee Tamil in late July 2020. LetsOTT, a digital media company announced that the film's post theatrical streaming rights were acquired by Amazon Prime Video, further adding that the film will be made available through the platform post 30-days of its theatrical run. The film's Tamil Nadu theatrical rights were sold to  crores.

A day before the scheduled release on 8 April 2021, The Government of Tamil Nadu imposed 50% seating capacity in theatres due to surge in COVID-19 cases in Tamil Nadu. Producer Kalaipuli S. Thanu tweeted that the film will be released on the scheduled date despite new restrictions on theatre occupancy being imposed. Advanced bookings of the film were started on 6 April 2021, post Tamil Nadu Legislative Assembly elections. Due to the huge demand for the film, many theatres announced screening early morning shows across Tamil Nadu.

Home media 
The Satellite Rights of the film were sold to Zee Tamil and the Streaming Rights of the film were acquired by Amazon Prime Video. It was streamed on Amazon Prime Video on 14 May 2021. It was premiered on Zee Tamil at 6:00 PM on the occasion of Independence Day.

Reception

Box office 
Karnan registered ₹10.40 crore at the box office, which marked Dhanush's highest opening in his career. Despite 50% occupancy limit, the film earned ₹25.60 crores during the opening weekend, due to the positive word-of-mouth. The film received good response from audience at the rural centres, which helped a raise through its collections. The collections of the film were much affected by the new restrictions for theatres in order to curb COVID-19; as of the first eleven days of its release, it collected ₹46 crore from Tamil Nadu alone.

Critical response 
Srivatsan S. of The Hindu praised the film for its powerful portrayal of resistance of the oppressed, saying "In Pariyerum Perumal, the message was: “Until you change, nothing is going to change." But with Karnan, the message seems to be even more clear: "It doesn't matter if you change, we won't."" Bharaty Singaravel of The News Minute wrote "With the release of his much-anticipated second film, Karnan, [Selvaraj] establishes a formidable space for himself amongst the young, progressive voices of current Tamil cinema" and gave four-and-a-half out of five stars for the film. Baradwaj Rangan of Film Companion South wrote "Like Pariyerum Perumal was carried by Kathir, Karnan is carried by Dhanush. This is a fantastic performance which is not very surprising but what surprises you is how many variations he brings in".

Saibal Chatterjee of NDTV praised the film for its hard-hitting treatment of caste exploitation, writing: "The canvas is wider, the treatment of the theme of rebellion against exploitation is more elaborate, and the socio-political commentary is invested with greater buoyancy." M. Suganth, editor-in-chief of The Times of India gave four out of five stars from the film stating "Karnan might seem like a familiar tale of struggle between the oppressed and oppressor, but Mari Selvaraj's detailing makes the film feel both unique and universal at the same time". Sudhir Srinivasan of Cinema Express gave four out of five stating "A deeply affecting, artistically fulfilling film, Mari Selvaraj's second film confirms that we can expect great things from this director".

Manoj Kumar R of The Indian Express gave five out of five stars for the film and wrote "This film needs to be experienced emotionally and visually. It is an approximation of generations of sufferings of people, who have been subjected to unspeakable atrocities owing to where they belong in the caste hierarchy." Ranjani Krishnakumar in her review for Firstpost explained the film's biggest success which lies in the writing, and also stated that "In spite of bringing together dozens of characters, Selvaraj makes each one of them real". She gave four-and-a-half out of five stars for the film.

Behindwoods Review Board gave 3.25 out of five stars while also stating "Dhanush and Mari deliver a strong statement against oppression through Karnan." A critic from Sify gave five out of five stars saying "Karnan is a classic revenge saga that talks about the pain, suffering, and rise of the oppressed." In his review for Hindustan Times, Haricharan Pudipeddi praised the film stating it as "one of the most powerful films of Tamil cinema in recent years".

Controversies

Title issue 
With the film's title announced on 6 January, it received criticism from fans of Sivaji Ganesan, as Ganesan starred in the 1964 film of the same name, as the Mahabharata character Karnan. R. Chandrashekharan, president of the Sivaji Social Welfare Association, wrote a letter to producer Thanu requesting a change in the film's title. In the letter, Chandrashekharan stated "Karnan refers to a giver, a benevolent giver. But it's said that your film is on someone who fights for rights. It's an acceptable title if you're recreating the story of Mahabharata. But for a social film, it's not right to use the title Karnan and for you to act in it". He added that doing so would not only hurt Ganesan's fans but also those of the Mahabharata.

Protests from Tamil Nadu Mukkulathor Pulipadai 
On 21 February, former actor and politician Karunas from the Tamil Nadu Mukkulathor Pulipadai, demanded ban on the film since it was reported to be based on the 1995 Kodiyankulam caste riots. The party has issued a press release saying that the movie is against a particular caste and that these movies will affect the peace in the society, and also mentioned a scene where Dhanush's character attacks a police station and that it degrades police. He further demanded that the film's director Mari Selvaraj should be arrested for instigating caste-based riots. The shooting of the film was further halted on 4 March 2020. In response to the issue, Selvaraj stated in an online interaction with the film is not based on the Kodiyankulam caste riots.

Historical accuracy 
Udhayanidhi Stalin (Youth Wing leader of Dravida Munnetra Kazhagam), who praised the film and its makers, also pointed out the alleged discrepancy in the timeline of the riots. In his tweet about the film, he stated that the Kodiyankulam violence happened 1995, but the year shown in the film was 1997, which had irked some of the party' sympathisers and members, as DMK was in power in 1997. He shared the factual error with director Mari Selvaraj and producer Thanu, with both being agreed to rectify the inaccuracies. Mari Selvaraj explained the film's setting in 1997 to provide a reference to how people lived during the time. Later on, the makers changed the period to just the "later part of the 90s". But with DMK's disapproval in the changes, the team later released a card which had a quote stating "The times when the common man began to fight for the basic needs and human rights", in place of the incident's date shown in the film.

Notes

References

External links 
 

2021 action drama films
2021 films
Films scored by Santhosh Narayanan
Films shot in Thoothukudi
Films shot in Tirunelveli
Indian action drama films
Films set in 1995
Films set in 1997
Films set in 2007
Films set in Madurai
Films about the caste system in India
Indian films based on actual events